A transition metal alkoxide complex is a kind of coordination complex containing one or more alkoxide ligands, written as , where R is the organic substituent. Metal alkoxides are used for coatings and as catalysts.

Preparation

By metathesis reactions
Many alkoxides are prepared by salt-forming reactions from a metal chlorides and sodium alkoxide:

Such reactions are favored by the lattice energy of the NaCl, and purification of the product alkoxide is simplified by the fact that NaCl is insoluble in common organic solvents.

For electrophilic metal halides, conversion to the alkoxide requires no or mild base. Titanium tetrachloride reacts with alcohols to give the corresponding tetraalkoxides, concomitant with the evolution of hydrogen chloride:

The reaction can be accelerated by the addition of a base, such as a tertiary amine.  Other electrophilic metal halides can be used instead of titanium, for example .

By electrochemical processes
Many alkoxides can be prepared by anodic dissolution of the corresponding metals in water-free alcohols in the presence of electroconductive additive. The metals may be Co, Ga, Ge, Hf, Fe, Ni, Nb, Mo, La, Re, Sc, Si, Ti, Ta, W, Y, Zr, etc. The conductive additive may be lithium chloride, quaternary ammonium halide, or other.

Reactions

Hydrolysis and transesterification
Aliphatic metal alkoxides decompose in water: where R is an organic substituent and L is an unspecified ligand (often an alkoxide). A well-studied case is the irreversible hydrolysis of titanium isopropoxide:

 

By controlling the stoichiometry and steric properties of the alkoxide, such reactions can be arrested leading to metal-oxy-alkoxides, which usually are oligonuclear.  Other alcohols can be employed in place of water.  In this way one alkoxide can be converted to another, and the process is properly referred to as alcoholysis (although there is an issue of terminology confusion with transesterification, a different process - see below). The position of the equilibrium can be controlled by the acidity of the alcohol; for example phenols typically react with alkoxides to release alcohols, giving the corresponding phenoxide.  More simply, the alcoholysis can be controlled by selectively evaporating the more volatile component.  In this way, ethoxides can be converted to butoxides, since ethanol (b.p. 78 °C) is more volatile than butanol (b.p. 118 °C).

Formation of oxo-alkoxides
Many metal alkoxide compounds also feature oxo-ligands. Oxo-ligands typically arise via the hydrolysis, often accidentally, and via ether elimination:

Additionally, low valent metal alkoxides are susceptible to oxidation by air.

Characteristically, transition metal alkoxides are polynuclear, that is they contain more than one metal.  Alkoxides are sterically undemanding and highly basic ligands that tend to bridge metals.

Upon the isomorphic substitution of metal atoms close in properties crystalline complexes of variable composition are formed. The metal ratio in such compounds can vary over a broad range.

Insertion into M-OR bond
Alkoxide ligands are often nucleophilic.  They often undergo insertion reactions with unsaturated substrates such as carbon dioxide and isocyanates.

Hydrogenolysis
The metal-alkoxide bond is susceptible to hydrogenolysis, especially for platinum metal derivatives:

Illustrative alkoxides

References

Functional groups
Bases (chemistry)
 
Coordination chemistry